John Q. Public (and several similar names; see the Variations section below) is a generic name and placeholder name, especially in American English, to denote a hypothetical member of society, deemed a "common man", who is presumed to represent the randomly selected "man on the street".

The equivalent term in British English is Joe Public.

Variations

There are various similar terms for the average Joe, including John Q. Citizen and John Q. Taxpayer, or Jane Q. Public, Jane Q. Citizen, and Jane Q. Taxpayer for a woman. The name John Doe is used in a similar manner. The term Tom, Dick, and Harry is often used to denote multiple hypothetical persons. An equivalent term is Joe Public which is used in the United Kingdom.

Roughly equivalent are the names Joe Blow, Joe Six-pack, and the nowadays rather less popular Joe Doakes and Joe Shmoe, the last of which implies a lower-class citizen (from the Yiddish שמאָ schmo: simpleton, or possibly Hebrew שמו sh'mo: (what's)-his-name). On a higher plane, the Talmudic generic place-marker name Plony (which can be translated to Mr. X. or Anonymous) is used as a reference in any case which is applicable to anyone – Sanhedrin 43a provides an example.

Usage
In the United States, the term John Q. Public is used by law enforcement officers to refer to an individual with no criminal bent, as opposed to terms like perp (short for perpetrator) or skell to qualify unsavory individuals.

2008 Republican Vice Presidential nominee Sarah Palin infamously referred to "Joe Sixpack and Hockey moms" during a debate. Presidential candidate John McCain referenced a similar symbol, this time represented by an actual person, saying that Senator Obama's tax plan would hurt Joe the Plumber's bottom line. A fifteen-minute debate on this issue ensued, with both candidates speaking directly to "Joe".

History
John, Quisquam and "The Public" first appears in the formation of the United States as a nation where English and German were being discussed as the official language of the new United States in the later 1700s. Many new Americans of Lutheran German heritage also spoke Latin and used the term "quisquam" with a gender neutral meaning of "anyone" where, in English, John was the generic male term for a person.

The term John Q. Public was the name of a character created by Vaughn Shoemaker, an editorial cartoonist for the Chicago Daily News, in 1922.  Jim Lange, the editorial cartoonist for The Oklahoman for 58 years, was closely identified with a version of the John Q. Public character, whom he sometimes also called "Mr. Voter".  Lange's version of the character was described as "bespectacled, mustachioed, fedora-wearing".  In 2006 the Oklahoma State Senate voted to make this character the "state's official editorial cartoon."

Other English-speaking countries
The equivalent in the United Kingdom is Joe (or Jane) Public,  John Smith, or Fred Bloggs or Joe Bloggs. Also, the man in the street, the man on the Clapham omnibus, and the aforementioned Tom, Dick and Harry. Tommy or Tommy Atkins is used as a generic soldier's name.

In Australia and New Zealand, John (or Jane) Citizen is usually seen as a placeholder in credit card advertisements, while Joe (or Jane) Bloggs is also commonly used in speech. Joe Blow is also used, often to suggest a possibly undesirable person. For example: "You left the door open so any Joe Blow could have walked in." Also used: Fred Nurk, Joe Farnarkle.

In Ireland Joe Soap is used as a generic reference to a male. Also Seán and Síle Citizen; Irish: Seán Ó Rudaí, from rud = thing(s).

In Canada, during the 1960s, a person appeared in editorial cartoons called Uno Who, representing an average, downtrodden citizen. He was always shown wearing a bankruptcy barrel (as did Will Johnstone's earlier and similar character, "the Taxpayer", for the American New York World Telegram). Québecers also use Monsieur-Madame-Tout-le-Monde ("Mr-and-Ms-Everybody") or Monsieur Untel ("Mr-So-and-so"). Jos Bleau (Joe Blow, spelled according to the rules of French) and G. Raymond are also used in Canada. Occasionally, names which are invariant when translated between English and French are favoured in advertising material (such as "Nicole Martin" or "Carole Martin" on packets of retail coupons).

References

Anonymity pseudonyms
Law of the United States
Legal fictions
Personifications
Placeholder names